Gajwa Station is a station on the Gyeongui–Jungang Line in Seoul, South Korea.

History 
The station is the last stop between Sinchon Station and Digital Media City Station on the Gyeongui Line and Yongsan Line, followed by Sogang University Station on the Yongsan Line. Gajwa Station opened on 1 December 1930 and Gyeongui Line opened on 1 July 2009.

In September 2019, an idle space on the first basement floor of Gajwa Station was created as an office space for social and economic enterprises and start-ups. The site has been named Gajwa Station Social Venture Hub Center.

Nearby Facilities 
Near the station, there are Namgajwa 1-dong Community Center, Sandnae Market, and Hongjecheon Stream.

References

External links

 Station information from Korail

Seoul Metropolitan Subway stations
Railway stations opened in 1930
Metro stations in Seodaemun District
Metro stations in Mapo District
Gyeongui Line
Gyeongui–Jungang Line
Yongsan Line